Preston Corporation Tramways operated a tramway service in Preston, Lancashire, between 1886 and 1934.

History

Preston Council bought out the operation of the horse drawn Preston Tramways Company on 31 December 1886.

Electrification resulted in the first modernised route opening on 7 June 1904. Routes extended to Penwortham Bridge, Ashton-on-Ribble, Ribbleton and Farringdon Park, and there was also a circular route via Fulwood.

Closure

The system closed on 15 December 1935.

Reinstatement

In 2010, Preston Trampower proposed to reinstate trams in Preston by building a new tramline from Preston railway station to Redscar Business Park. The scheme, known as the Guild Line, was planned for opening in 2019.

References

A brief history of Preston’s former public tramways - Blog Preston

Tram transport in England
Transport in Preston
History of Preston
Historic transport in Lancashire